The 1982–83 Vancouver Canucks season was the team's 13th in the National Hockey League (NHL).

Offseason
Harry Neale was named general manager on June 1st. Previous general manager Jake Milford moved into an advisory role and signed a two-year contract as Senior Vice-President and alternate governor.

Regular season

Final standings

Schedule and results

Playoffs

Player statistics

Awards and records

Transactions

Draft picks
Vancouver's draft picks at the 1982 NHL Entry Draft held at the Montreal Forum in Montreal, Quebec.

Farm teams

See also
1982–83 NHL season

References

External links
 

Vancouver Canucks seasons
Vancouver C
Vancouver
Vancouver Canucks
Vancouver Canucks